The Spokane Journal of Business is an independent business newspaper founded in February 1986 which covers news primarily in Eastern Washington State and Northern Idaho including Spokane, Washington, and Coeur d’Alene, Idaho. The Journal is published bi-weekly, 26 times a year, and has an audited circulation of about 14,000.

Linn Parish is currently the editor of the publication and Mike McLean is the deputy editor.

References

External links
 The Spokane Journal of Business website

Cowles Company
Mass media in Spokane, Washington
Newspapers published in Washington (state)